Tony Ries Sr. (23 November 1913 – 13 May 1989) was a South African wrestler. At 34, He competed in the men's freestyle lightweight at the 1948 Summer Olympics.

References

External links
 

1913 births
1989 deaths
South African male sport wrestlers
Olympic wrestlers of South Africa
Wrestlers at the 1948 Summer Olympics
Sportspeople from Bloemfontein